Mark Dymond (born 1974, Wimbledon, London) is an English actor of Irish descent.  In addition to appearances in films, he is known as Dr. Lorcan O'Brien, a major character in the 2007–2009 seasons of the TV drama series The Clinic, among other TV shows. He married actress Jo Bourne-Taylor in 2004.
In 2002 he played the minor role of Van Bierk in the James Bond film Die Another Day.

Dymond has an occasional recurring role in the television comedy series Mrs. Brown's Boys as Mick O'Leary, the on-off boyfriend of Cathy Brown.

Filmography

References
 Mark Dymond profile at PBS

External links

21st-century English male actors
Living people
People from Wimbledon, London
1974 births
English male television actors